Rabale is a railway station on the Harbour line of the Mumbai Suburban Railway network.

References

Railway stations in Thane district
Mumbai Suburban Railway stations
Mumbai CR railway division